Stenomacrus is a genus of parasitoid wasps belonging to the family Ichneumonidae.

The distribution of this genus is cosmopolitan.

Species
The following species are recognised in the genus Stenomacrus:
 
 Stenomacrus affinitor Aubert, 1981 
 Stenomacrus americanus (Ashmead, 1896)
 Stenomacrus anceps Szepligeti, 1898
 Stenomacrus atratus (Holmgren, 1858)
 Stenomacrus binotatus (Holmgren, 1858)
 Stenomacrus bispinus (Holmgren, 1858)
 Stenomacrus brevicubitus Kolarov, 1986
 Stenomacrus brevipennis (Ashmead, 1902)
 Stenomacrus californicus (Ashmead, 1896)
 Stenomacrus carbonariae Roman, 1939
 Stenomacrus caudatus (Holmgren, 1858)
 Stenomacrus celer (Holmgren, 1858)
 Stenomacrus cephalotes (Holmgren, 1858)
 Stenomacrus cognatus (Holmgren, 1858)
 Stenomacrus columbianus (Ashmead, 1896)
 Stenomacrus cubiceps (Thomson, 1897)
 Stenomacrus curvicaudatus (Brischke, 1871)
 Stenomacrus curvulus (Thomson, 1897)
 Stenomacrus deletus (Thomson, 1897)
 Stenomacrus dendrolimi (Matsumura, 1926)
 Stenomacrus difficilis Jussila, 1996
 Stenomacrus dubiosus (Ashmead, 1902)
 Stenomacrus exserens (Thomson, 1898)
 Stenomacrus exsertor Aubert, 1981
 Stenomacrus flaviceps (Gravenhorst, 1829)
 Stenomacrus groenlandicus Jussila, 1996
 Stenomacrus hastatus (Holmgren, 1858)
 Stenomacrus hilaris (Holmgren, 1883)
 Stenomacrus holmgreni (Kirchner, 1867)
 Stenomacrus incisus (Gravenhorst, 1829)
 Stenomacrus inferior Aubert, 1981
 Stenomacrus innotatus (Thomson, 1897)
 Stenomacrus kincaidi (Ashmead, 1902)
 Stenomacrus laminatus Szepligeti, 1898
 Stenomacrus lankesterae Kittel, 2016
 Stenomacrus laricis (Haliday, 1838)
 Stenomacrus laticollis (Holmgren, 1883)
 Stenomacrus longipes Jussila, 1996
 Stenomacrus meijeri Woelke, Pham & Humala, 2020
 Stenomacrus mellipes (Provancher, 1888)
 Stenomacrus merula (Gravenhorst, 1829)
 Stenomacrus micropennis Jussila, 2006
 Stenomacrus minutissimus (Zetterstedt, 1838)
 Stenomacrus minutor Aubert, 1981
 Stenomacrus molestus (Holmgren, 1858)
 Stenomacrus monticola (Cushman, 1922)
 Stenomacrus nemoralis (Holmgren, 1858)
 Stenomacrus obliquus Statz, 1936
 Stenomacrus ochripes (Holmgren, 1858)
 Stenomacrus pallipes (Holmgren, 1858)
 Stenomacrus palustris (Holmgren, 1858)
 Stenomacrus payet Rousse & Villemant, 2012
 Stenomacrus pedestris (Holmgren, 1869)
 Stenomacrus pexatus (Holmgren, 1858)
 Stenomacrus premitus (Davis, 1897)
 Stenomacrus pusillator Aubert, 1981
 Stenomacrus pygmaeus Y.u.Horstmann, 1999
 Stenomacrus rivosus (Holmgren, 1883)
 Stenomacrus silvaticus (Holmgren, 1858)
 Stenomacrus solidatus (Brues, 1910)
 Stenomacrus solitarius (Holmgren, 1883)
 Stenomacrus superus (Thomson, 1897)
 Stenomacrus terebrator Roman, 1934
 Stenomacrus terrestris Roman, 1926
 Stenomacrus tuberculatus Kolarov, 1986
 Stenomacrus ulmicola (Ashmead, 1896)
 Stenomacrus undulatus (Davis, 1897)
 Stenomacrus ungula (Thomson, 1897)
 Stenomacrus vafer (Holmgren, 1858)
 Stenomacrus validicornis (Boheman, 1866)
 Stenomacrus variabilis (Ashmead, 1894)
 Stenomacrus varius (Holmgren, 1858)
 Stenomacrus vitripennis (Holmgren, 1858)
 Stenomacrus zaykovi Kolarov, 1986
 BOLD:AAB4997 (Stenomacrus sp.)
 BOLD:AAC1404 (Stenomacrus sp.)
 BOLD:AAC3396 (Stenomacrus sp.)
 BOLD:AAD0179 (Stenomacrus sp.)
 BOLD:AAD0219 (Stenomacrus sp.)
 BOLD:AAD0245 (Stenomacrus sp.)
 BOLD:AAD8052 (Stenomacrus sp.)
 BOLD:AAE2018 (Stenomacrus sp.)
 BOLD:AAE9001 (Stenomacrus sp.)
 BOLD:AAE9002 (Stenomacrus sp.)
 BOLD:AAF3467 (Stenomacrus sp.)
 BOLD:AAF3476 (Stenomacrus sp.)
 BOLD:AAF3664 (Stenomacrus sp.)
 BOLD:AAG0952 (Stenomacrus sp.)
 BOLD:AAG0974 (Stenomacrus sp.)
 BOLD:AAG0976 (Stenomacrus sp.)
 BOLD:AAG0980 (Stenomacrus sp.)
 BOLD:AAG0982 (Stenomacrus sp.)
 BOLD:AAG8257 (Stenomacrus sp.)
 BOLD:AAH1490 (Stenomacrus sp.)
 BOLD:AAH1493 (Stenomacrus sp.)
 BOLD:AAH1500 (Stenomacrus sp.)
 BOLD:AAH1508 (Stenomacrus sp.)
 BOLD:AAH1571 (Stenomacrus sp.)
 BOLD:AAH1609 (Stenomacrus sp.)
 BOLD:AAH1610 (Stenomacrus sp.)
 BOLD:AAH1623 (Stenomacrus sp.)
 BOLD:AAH1632 (Stenomacrus sp.)
 BOLD:AAH1710 (Stenomacrus sp.)
 BOLD:AAH1782 (Stenomacrus sp.)
 BOLD:AAH1785 (Stenomacrus sp.)
 BOLD:AAH1823 (Stenomacrus sp.)
 BOLD:AAH9934 (Stenomacrus sp.)
 BOLD:AAJ5372 (Stenomacrus sp.)
 BOLD:AAJ5384 (Stenomacrus sp.)
 BOLD:AAM7533 (Stenomacrus sp.)
 BOLD:AAP6689 (Stenomacrus sp.)
 BOLD:AAU8210 (Stenomacrus sp.)
 BOLD:AAU8582 (Stenomacrus sp.)
 BOLD:AAU8582 (Stenomacrus sp.)
 BOLD:AAU9772 (Stenomacrus sp.)
 BOLD:AAU9773 (Stenomacrus sp.)
 BOLD:AAU9777 (Stenomacrus sp.)
 BOLD:AAZ0181 (Stenomacrus sp.)
 BOLD:AAZ0832 (Stenomacrus sp.)
 BOLD:ABA6031 (Stenomacrus sp.)
 BOLD:ABX8297 (Stenomacrus sp.)
 BOLD:ACB2448 (Stenomacrus sp.)
 BOLD:ACC0639 (Stenomacrus sp.)
 BOLD:ACC1987 (Stenomacrus sp.)
 BOLD:ACC4455 (Stenomacrus sp.)
 BOLD:ACC6839 (Stenomacrus sp.)
 BOLD:ACC7160 (Stenomacrus sp.)
 BOLD:ACC7954 (Stenomacrus sp.)
 BOLD:ACD1949 (Stenomacrus sp.)
 BOLD:ACD6520 (Stenomacrus sp.)
 BOLD:ACD8497 (Stenomacrus sp.)
 BOLD:ACE4848 (Stenomacrus sp.)
 BOLD:ACF9868 (Stenomacrus sp.)
 BOLD:ACG2500 (Stenomacrus sp.)
 BOLD:ACG3877 (Stenomacrus sp.)
 BOLD:ACG4370 (Stenomacrus sp.)
 BOLD:ACG7128 (Stenomacrus sp.)
 BOLD:ACM2072 (Stenomacrus sp.)
 BOLD:ACN3086 (Stenomacrus sp.)
 BOLD:ACO0741 (Stenomacrus sp.)
 BOLD:ACO5469 (Stenomacrus sp.)
 BOLD:ACP7752 (Stenomacrus sp.)
 BOLD:ACP9744 (Stenomacrus sp.)
 BOLD:ACQ7194 (Stenomacrus sp.)
 BOLD:ACR0086 (Stenomacrus sp.)
 BOLD:ACS5323 (Stenomacrus sp.)
 BOLD:ACU2014 (Stenomacrus sp.)
 BOLD:ACU2214 (Stenomacrus sp.)
 BOLD:ACU9087 (Stenomacrus sp.)
 BOLD:ACV1717 (Stenomacrus sp.)
 BOLD:ACX8957 (Stenomacrus sp.)
 BOLD:ACY8214 (Stenomacrus sp.)
 BOLD:ADE2391 (Stenomacrus sp.)
 BOLD:ADK9855 (Stenomacrus sp.)
 BOLD:ADT5878 (Stenomacrus sp.)
 BOLD:ADT8836 (Stenomacrus sp.)
 BOLD:AEC6961 (Stenomacrus sp.)

References

Ichneumonidae
Ichneumonidae genera